The Troy–Waterford Bridge carries U.S. Route 4 across the Hudson River in New York connecting Waterford with Troy. The bridge is two lanes wide, with sidewalks on both sides. The bridge serves as a replacement for the 1804-built Union Bridge, which burned on July 10, 1909.

The Waterford Bridges, which include the current bridge and the original 1804 bridge, were designated as a National Historic Civil Engineering Landmark by the American Society of Civil Engineers in 2013.

See also
 
 
 
 List of fixed crossings of the Hudson River

References

Bridges over the Hudson River
Bridges completed in 1804

Road bridges in New York (state)
U.S. Route 4
Bridges of the United States Numbered Highway System
Bridges in Rensselaer County, New York
Bridges in Saratoga County, New York
Historic Civil Engineering Landmarks
Truss bridges in the United States
1909 establishments in New York (state)